All Roads to Fault is an EP by British experimental post-hardcore band Yourcodenameis:Milo, released in 2004. The most recent edition of the album features music videos for "All Roads to Fault" and "The Problem", which were both released as singles.

Track listing
 "All Roads to Fault" - 2:45
 "The Problem" – 2:38
 "Iron Chef" – 5:16
 "First Mater Responds" – 3:31
 "Fourthree" – 2:59
 "Lions, Then The Donkeys" – 4:05
 "Rob The Hed" – 4:21

References

2004 EPs
Yourcodenameis:milo albums
Albums produced by Steve Albini
Polydor Records EPs